Gonzalo Andrés Domingo Fernández de Córdoba (31 December 1585 – 16 February 1635) was one of the main Spanish military leaders during the Eighty Years' War,[?] Thirty Years' War, and the War of the Mantuan Succession.

Biography
He was born at Cabra, in what is now the Province of Córdoba and was the third son of Antonio Fernández de Córdoba Cardona y Requesens, the Duke of Soma and was great grandchild of his namesake Gonzalo Fernández de Córdoba, the Great Capitan. He was one of the principal commanders in the Catholic alliance under the Imperial general Johann Tserclaes, Count of Tilly in the successful battles of Wimpfen and Höchst.

From 1621 to 1623 he commanded units of the Army of Flanders in the Palatinate, and Flanders, and defeated the Anglo-German Protestant forces in the sieges of Bacharach and Heidelberg and the Dutch at Fleurus.

In 1624 was awarded the title of the first Prince of Maratea by King Philip IV of Spain, and in 1630 he was awarded the title of Prince of the Holy Roman Empire by the Emperor Ferdinand II.

From 1625 to 1629 he was Governor of the Duchy of Milan. In 1628 he took part in the War of the Mantuan Succession. When he failed to take Casale and stop the French invasion in 1629, he was called back to Madrid and court-martialed.

He was reinstated a few years later and sent to the Netherlands in 1632. Here he conducted operations on the lower Rhine in the rear of the victorious army of Gustavus Adolphus, but he was unable to prevent the Capture of Maastricht by Frederick Henry, Prince of Orange. He was recalled to Spain in 1633 and died at Montalbán in 1635, without having been married, and with no issue.

Trivia 
He is also a character in the novel The Betrothed, where Alessandro Manzoni describes the anger of the Milanese populace towards him, when he leaves Milan in 1629.

References

Guthrie, P William. Battles of the Thirty Years War: From White Mountain to Nordlingen, 1618-1635  Greenwood Press (2001) 
Pursell, C Brennan The Winter King: Frederick V of the Palatinate and the Coming of the Thirty Years' War Ashgate Publishing (2003) 
Black, Jeremy European Warfare, 1494-1660. Routledge Publishing (2002) 
Lawrence, R David. The Complete Soldier: Military Books and Military Culture in Early Stuart England, 1603-1645. Brill Academic Publishing. 
 Josef V. Polišenský/Frederick Snider: War and society in Europe (1618-1648). Bristol: Cambridge University Press, 1978.

External links
Zedlers Universallexicon, vol. 6, p. 652-653
http://www.grandesp.org.uk/historia/gzas/cabra.htm

1585 births
1635 deaths
People from the Province of Córdoba (Spain)
Spanish generals
Military personnel of the Thirty Years' War